Saliotite is a rare colorless to pearl white phyllosilicate mineral in the smectite group with formula . It is an ordered 1:1 interstratification of cookeite and paragonite. It has perfect cleavage, a pearly luster and leaves a white streak. Its crystal structure is monoclinic, and it is a soft mineral with a hardness rated 2-3 on the Mohs scale. 

Saliotite was first described in 1994 for an occurrence in an outcrop of high grade schist north of Almeria, Andalusia, Spain. It was named for French geologist Pierre Saliot.

References

External links
Saliotite on euromin.w3sites.net (French)

Sodium minerals
Lithium minerals
Smectite group
Monoclinic minerals
Minerals in space group 12